Pandamangalam, a panchayat town in Namakkal district, Tamil Nadu is at a distance of about three kilometers from Velur, a Small town in Paramathi-Velur Taluk.

This small town is connected by roads from Velur and Jedarpalayam.

Etymology
It is also said that the old name for this town is Pandavar Mangalam which has become Pandamangalam at some later time.

Geography
Pandamangalam is located near the river Cauvery.

Demographics

 India census, Pandamangalam had a population of 5949. Males constitute 50% of the population and females 50%. Pandamangalam has an average literacy rate of 70%, higher than the national average of 59.5%: male literacy is 78%, and female literacy is 62%. In Pandamangalam, 9% of the population is under 6 years of age.

Festival
Two ratha [for Lord Vishnu and Goddess Maariamman],which is been pulled by devotees, around the town, during the festival time .

References

Cities and towns in Namakkal district